Justin Jesso (born Justin Stein) is an American singer and songwriter. He has written songs for Hrvy, AJ Mitchell, The Backstreet Boys and Armin van Buuren. He was nominated for Song of the Year at the 2017 Latin Grammy Awards for co-writing Ricky Martin's single "Vente Pa' Ca" (2016). He is a co-writer and featured artist on Kygo’s "Stargazing" (2017).

Early life 
Jesso grew up in a northern suburb of Chicago. As a youngster he wrote his own songs and also performed on stage in various theatres across Chicago. In later life,  he studied songwriting at the Clive Davis Institute in New York.

Career 
Jesso has written for many artists, including HRVY, The Backstreet Boys and AJ Mitchell.

In 2016, he co-wrote the Ricky Martin song "Vente Pa' Ca" featuring Maluma, which was nominated for Best Song at the 2017 Latin Grammy Awards. It lost out to "Despacito".

In 2017, Justin co-wrote "Stargazing" for Kygo with Stuart Crichton and Jamie Hartman. In 2018, he supported Kygo on his sold-out arena tour in Asia, Australia, Europe and North America. More recently, he co-wrote "The Way It Was" for The Backstreet Boy's latest album DNA.

Jesso released an EP, Let It Be Me in December 2018. The lead single "Getting Closer" was written after he toured with Kygo, and was about the loneliness of life on tour. The video, which was directed by Kyle Cogan, shares real footage of Jusso's time spent on tour. The song was popular in Europe, and was a top ten radio hit in Germany, Switzerland and Austria. It also charted at 11 in the German iTunes chart.

In February 2019, Jesso supported Tears for Fears on the European leg of their Rule The World tour. Jesso embarked on his first headline tour in North America in April 2019, where we played to venues in Los Angeles, Chicago and New York.

In June 2019, he released the title track, "Let It Be Me", a duet with Scottish singer-songwriter Nina Nesbitt.

In March 2022, he was announced as the representative of Illinois for the inaugural American Song Contest, set to begin later in the month. He competed in the fifth episode and did not qualify for the live semi-finals.

On Saturday, January 29th 2023, Justin sang the National Anthem at Gulfstream Park before the three Pegasus Stakes races.

Discography

Singles

EPs

Songwriting credits

References 

Year of birth missing (living people)
Living people
American singer-songwriters
American male singer-songwriters
American Song Contest contestants